"Letter to You" is a 2020 single by American heartland rock band Bruce Springsteen and the E Street Band. The song was released as a lead-in for the album of the same name on September 10, 2020. The song has received critical praise.

Critical reception
Kory Grow of Rolling Stone situates the song as part of a tradition in Springsteen's songwriting with his trademark earnestness and urgency but notes that, "Springsteen sings about exploring his inner self without truly divulging all that much... [and] Springsteen may never fully reveal himself, but the song still feels like a full picture because of the way he and his bandmates trust in themselves and each other musically." Dylan Jones of GQ considers the song epic and uses his review as an overview of Springsteen's career in combining strong storytelling in his songs with his shifts in musical genre, including "the poppy vein of his recent" work. 

Sam Sodomsky of Pitchfork Media calls the song "a heartfelt tribute to those ties that bind", noting how Springsteen's work with the E Street Band "is his conduit toward transcendence, community, and emotional uplift" and how those qualities are particularly needed in the present day. Writing for NJ.com, Bobby Olivier ranked 326 Bruce Springsteen songs, with this one coming in at 161 for being "familiarly forceful and earnest" and "strong, catchy and bodes well for the highly anticipated album coming".

Personnel
Bruce Springsteen and the E Street Band
Roy Bittan– keyboards
Charles Giordano– organ
Nils Lofgren– guitar
Patti Scialfa– guitar, backing vocals
Bruce Springsteen– guitar, vocals, production
Garry Tallent– bass guitar
Steven Van Zandt– guitar
Max Weinberg– drums

Technical personnel
Ron Aniello– production
Bob Clearmountain– mixing
Bob Ludwig– mastering

Charts

References

External links
Fan reception of the song from The Independent

2020 singles
2020 songs
Bruce Springsteen songs
Song recordings produced by Bruce Springsteen
Song recordings produced by Ron Aniello
Songs written by Bruce Springsteen